Kamalapur Assembly constituency is a former constituency of Andhra Pradesh Legislative Assembly in united Andhra Pradesh. In 2009, it was dissolved and merged with Huzurabad constituency. It was a part of Karimnagar district, in present-day Telangana.

Members of Legislative Assembly

References 

Former assembly constituencies of Telangana
Karimnagar district